The 2001 Stanford Cardinal football team represented Stanford University in the 2001 NCAA Division I-A football season. The team was led by head coach Tyrone Willingham who resigned at the end of the season to become the head coach at Notre Dame.

Schedule

Coaching staff

Tyrone Willingham – Head coach
Bill Diedrick – Offensive coordinator and quarterbacks
Buzz Preston – Running backs
Trent Miles – Wide receivers
John McDonell – Offensive line (centers and guards)
Mike Denbrock – Tight ends and offensive line (tackles)
Kent Baer – Defensive coordinator and linebackers
Phil Zacharias – Defensive ends and special teams coordinator
Denny Schuler – Defensive backs
Dave Tipton – Recruiting coordinator

Game Summaries

Boston College

Arizona State

at USC

Washington State

at No. 5 Oregon

No. 4 UCLA

at No. 11 Washington

at Arizona

California

Notre Dame

at San Jose State

vs. Georgia Tech (Seattle Bowl)

Awards and honors

All-American Selections
Eric Heitmann, Guard (AFCA-Coaches, FN)
Tank Williams, Safety  (AFCA-Coaches)
Luke Powell, Stanford (FWAA)

References

Stanford
Stanford Cardinal football seasons
Stanford Cardinal football